Out There may refer to:

Music
 Out There (Betty Carter album), a 1958 bop album by Betty Carter
 Out There (Eric Dolphy album), a 1961 jazz album by the late Eric Dolphy
 Out There (Love album), a 1971 compilation album by Love
 Out There (Rick Wakeman album), a 2003 progressive rock album by Rick Wakeman
 Out There (The Original Sins album), a 1992 album by The Original Sins
 Out There (Eleanor McEvoy album), a 2006 rock album by Eleanor McEvoy
 "Out There" (Dinosaur Jr. song), a song from Dinosaur Jr.'s 1993 album Where You Been
 "Out There" (Disney song), a song from the soundtrack to the 1996 animated film The Hunchback of Notre Dame
 Out There (tour), a 2013 concert tour by Paul McCartney

Television
 Out There (1951 TV series), a short-lived science fiction television program broadcast by CBS
 Out There (2003 TV series), a drama series by Noggin and Sesame Workshop
 Out There (2013 TV series), an animated series broadcast by IFC
 Stephen Fry: Out There, a documentary about homosexuality and the lives of gay people
 OutTHERE, a variety show series broadcast on Five and Bravo

Other uses 
 OutThere, a luxury travel magazine and LGBTQ magazine
 Out There (video game), an Android and iOS game
 LindseyB Outthere, member of the dance crew Beat Freaks

See also 
 Out of There, sculpture by Clement Meadmore
 Out Here (disambiguation)